1911 in philosophy

Events

Births 
 March 26 - J. L. Austin, English philosopher of language (d. 1960)
 June 4 or 12 - Milovan Đilas, Montenegran Yugoslav Marxist theoretician, politician, Partisan, dissident and author (d. 1995)
 June 11 - Norman Malcolm, American philosopher (d. 1990)

Deaths

References 

Philosophy
20th-century philosophy
Philosophy by year